Strepsinoma albimaculalis is a moth in the family Crambidae. It was described by Rothschild in 1915. It is found in New Guinea.

The wingspan is about 16 mm. The forewings are sooty grey-black, with a white wedge-shaped postmedian spot and a white subapical spot. The hindwings are sooty grey-black.

References

Acentropinae
Moths described in 1915